Mårran is a Swedish rock group formed in 2010 in Stockholm.

History 
The band was formed in 2010 by Morgan Korsmoe and Ludwig Larsson (both born 1989). Morgan grew up playing bass in his father's band Larz Kristerz but had a heavy urge for the rock music of the 1970s and wanted to start a group playing hard rock/blues rock. Morgan and guitarist Ludwig recruited drummer Björn "Binge" Inge (born 1952) from the renowned Swedish hard rock band November (the Swedish Cream and the first band to sing hard rock in Swedish in the early 1970s), Hammond organ player Max Lorentz (known for his work as producer and musician for very many artists in Sweden and Denmark) and rock vocalist Göran Edman, world known for his work with amongst others Yngwie Malmsteen. The group decided to write their own material in their native tongue of Swedish.

October 2011 saw the release of Mårran's debut CD-single "Gärdesbrud" on Blind Boyscout Records in a limited edition of 500 copies. 
In March 2012 the debut album Mårran was released in Sweden on S-Rock Records produced and mixed by Max Lorentz.

The songs on the album are:
1. Än sen (Rough English translation: "So What")
2. Folkvisa från Helvetet (Rough English translation: "Folk Ballad From Hell")
3. Syster Blå (Trollpolska från Älvdalen) Rough English translation: "Sister Blue (Goblin Dance From Älvdalen")
4. Gärdesbrud (Rough English translation: "Woodstock Girl")
5. Del av mitt liv (Rough English translation: "Part Of My Life")
6. Dina ögon är blå (Rough English translation: "Your Eyes Are Blue")
7. Tänk om (Rough English translation: "What If" or "Think Again")
8. Sockerflicka (Rough English translation: "Sugar Lady")
9. Med Lena (Rough English translation: "With Lena")
10. Ensamma stränder (Rough English translation: "Lonely Shores")
11. Gånglåt från Zinken (Rough English translation: "Marching Tune From Zinken")

The album got rave reviews in Sweden and an English version is planned for 2013.

Mårran made their first tour in November 2011 and their second in March 2012.

On November 16, 2012 Mårran released their second album Mårran 2 in Sweden on S-Rock Records produced and mixed by Max Lorentz.
The album got ever better reviews in the Swedish press.

The songs on the album are:
1. Arm i arm (Music-Mårran/Lyrics-Lorentz) (Rough English translation: "Arm in Arm" or "In Arms")
2. Kom in i min värld (Music-Mårran/Lyrics-Lorentz) (Rough English translation: "Come Into My World")
3. Sömngångarland (Music-Mårran/Lyrics-Lorentz) (Rough English translation: "Sleep-walker Land")
4. Allt försent (Music-Mårran/Lyrics-Lorentz) (Rough English translation: "Everything Too Late")
5. Perukvisa (Music-Mårran/Lyrics-Binge) (Rough English translation: "Wig Song")
6. Gråtbäck (Aldrig nu och aldrig mer) (Music-Mårran/Lyrics-Lorentz) (Rough English translation: "Crying Creek - Never Now or Never Ever")
7. Blues för Elle (Music-Mårran/Lyrics-Binge) (Rough English translation: "Blues for Elle")
8. Din religion (Music-Mårran/Lyrics-Lorentz) (Rough English translation: "Your Religion")
9. Roadie (Music-Mårran/Lyrics-Edman) (Rough English translation: "Roadie")
10. Illern (Music-Mårran/Lyrics-Edman-Lorentz) (Rough English translation: "The Ferret")
11. Samma sång igen (Music-Mårran/Lyrics-Lorentz) (Rough English translation: "The Same Song Again")

Also in November 2012 Mårran released their live EP "Mårran - Vid liv" ("Mårran - Alive") featuring Richard Rolf of November with the songs:
1. Roadie (Music-Mårran/Lyrics-Edman)
2. Kom in i min värld (Music-Mårran/Lyrics-Lorentz)
3. Med Lena (feat. Richard Rolf) (Music-Mårran/Lyrics-Lorentz)
4. Ensamma stränder (feat. Richard Rolf) (Music-Mårran/Lyrics-Binge-Lorentz)
"Ensamma stränder" features a tribute to the old November song "Balett Blues".

In March 2013 S-Rock released Mårran's debut album as a 180 gram vinyl LP.

On Record Store Day April 20, 2013 Mårran released a limited edition vinyl only single, each in its own unique cover made by the Swedish artist
Anders Hultman. Hultman, who also constructed the "Mårran-train" depicted on Mårran 2, made the covers out of old record covers, mostly
of the religious kind, from the 1960s. This was considered as an environmental statement for re-cycling. The songs were recorded during the making of Mårran 1.
1. Nattens kristall (Max Lorentz) (Rough English translation: Crystal of the Night")
2. Skatsilverland (Music-Mårran/Lyrics-Edman-Lorentz) (Rough English translation: "Magpie-silver land").

On January 1, 2014 Mårran released their 3rd studio album Mårran 3/4 part one in a series of two albums where part two Mårran III/IV AP-IX will be released in April 2014.
The album was again produced by Max Lorentz but this time recorded at the Maroli Studios, Stockholm. On these two albums the group added cello, which doubles the guitar riffs, to all the songs.
The cello was played by Max's step son Kevin Kirs Verstege.

The songs on the album are:
1. Vaggvisan (Music: Mårran Lyrics: Lorentz/Inge)  (Rough English translation: "The Lullabye")
2. I en annan värld (Music & Lyrics: Lorentz) (Rough English translation: "In Another World")
3. Dårarnas hotell (Music: Mårran Lyrics: Lorentz) (Rough English translation: "Madmen's hotel")
4. Karneval av ljus (Music: Mårran Lyrics: Lorentz) (Rough English translation: "Carnival of Light")
5. Begravningståg för morgondagen (Music: Mårran Lyrics: Inge)  (Rough English translation: "Funeral Procession for Tomorrow")
6. Jag och min skugga (Music: Mårran Lyrics: Inge) (Rough English translation: "Me and My Shadow")
7. Helt enorm (Music: Mårran Lyrics: Lorentz)  (Rough English translation: "Completely Grand")
8. När du är död (får du vila) (Music: Mårran Lyrics: Lorentz) (Rough English translation: "(You'll Get Rest) When You're Dead")
9. Mårrschottis/Så dum (Music: Mårran Lyrics: Lorentz) (Rough English translation: "Mårran's Schottis/So stupid")
10. Tro på mitt ord (Music: Mårran Lyrics: Lorentz) (Rough English translation: "Believe My Words")

Members 
Göran Edman - vocals.
Björn Inge - drums.
Morgan Korsmoe - bass.
Ludwig Larsson - guitar.
Max Lorentz - Hammond organ.

Discography

Album 
 2012 - Mårran
 2012 - Mårran 2
 2012 - Mårran - Vid liv
 2013 - Mårran - vinyl LP
 2014 - Mårran 3/4

Singles 
 2011 - Gärdesbrud
 2013 - Nattens kristall/Skatsilverland

References

External links 
 Officiell webbplats

Swedish rock music groups